Thomas Ghee (1873–1939) was a Scottish footballer who played in the Football League for Darwen and Newcastle United.

References

1873 births
1939 deaths
Scottish footballers
English Football League players
Association football midfielders
Kilmarnock F.C. players
Darwen F.C. players
St Mirren F.C. players
Newcastle United F.C. players